Northern District Police Station is a historic police station located at Baltimore, Maryland, United States. It is a complex of interconnected buildings designed in the late Victorian/French Renaissance style consisting of a three-story main station house with a hipped roof and dormers; a connected two story building which had originally housed the cellblock; and a pair of hipped roof garages which were originally used as livery buildings. They are in turn connected to an "L"-shaped building consisting of the original clerestoried stable and flat roofed garage. The buildings encircle a courtyard which is now used as a parking lot.  It was designed by Henry F. Brauns in 1899.

Northern District Police Station was listed on the National Register of Historic Places in 2001.

References

External links
, including photo from 2001, at Maryland Historical Trust

Buildings and structures in Baltimore
Government buildings on the National Register of Historic Places in Baltimore
Government buildings completed in 1899
Hampden, Baltimore
Infrastructure completed in 1899
Police stations on the National Register of Historic Places
1899 establishments in Maryland
Baltimore Police Department
Baltimore City Landmarks